Mohd Yusni bin Mat Piah is a Malaysian politician who has served as Member of the Penang State Legislative Assembly (MLA) for Penaga since May 2018. He is a member of the Malaysian Islamic Party (PAS), a component party of the state opposition but federal ruling Perikatan Nasional (PN) coalition. He is also presently the sole PAS Penang MLA.

Election result

Awards and recognition 
 :
 Officer of the Order of the Defender of the Realm (K.M.N.) (2021)

References

Malaysian Islamic Party politicians
Malaysian Muslims
Living people
Year of birth missing (living people)
Officers of the Order of the Defender of the Realm